The Eastern Conference is one of two conferences that make up the National Basketball Association (NBA), the other being the Western Conference. Both conferences consist of 15 teams organized into three divisions.

The current divisional alignment was adopted at the start of the 2004–05 season, when the now Charlotte Hornets began play as the NBA's 30th franchise. This necessitated the move of the New Orleans Pelicans from the Eastern Conference's Central Division to the newly created Southwest Division of the Western Conference.

The NBA first started awarding an Eastern Conference championship trophy during the 2000–01 season, renaming it after Hall of Famer Bob Cousy in the 2021–22 season. Also in 2021–22, the league began awarding the Larry Bird Trophy to the Eastern Conference Finals Most Valuable Player, named after Hall of Famer Larry Bird.

Current standings

Teams

Former teams

Notes
 denotes an expansion team.
 denotes a team that merged from the American Basketball Association (ABA).

Team timeline

Eastern Conference champions

Eastern Conference championships by team
 10: Boston Celtics
 6: Chicago Bulls
 6: Miami Heat
 5: Cleveland Cavaliers
 5: Detroit Pistons
 5: Philadelphia 76ers
 4: Baltimore/Washington Bullets
 4: New York Knicks
 2: New Jersey/Brooklyn Nets
 2: Orlando Magic
 1: Indiana Pacers
 1: Milwaukee Bucks
 1: Toronto Raptors
 0: Atlanta Hawks
 0: Charlotte Hornets

Season results

References

 
NBA